Premoli is a surname that may refer to:

Augusto Premoli (1925–2018), Argentine Olympic modern pentathlete
Flavio Premoli (born 1949), Italian musician and composer
Giovanni Premoli, alias of Janko Premrl (1920–1943), Slovene partisan
Luzia Premoli (born 1955), Brazilian Catholic nun and missionary

See also
Premolis, a genus of moths

Surnames